Comic ballet is a subcategory of narrative ballet, and denotes a dramatic work of a light or comic nature. Catherine d'Medici enjoyed the Italian custom of staging entertainments where classical or allegorical legends were retold through music and dancing, and she introduced this custom to France. It was Catherine's court festival director, Baltazarini da Belgiojoso who staged and choreographed the 'Ballet Comique de la Reine'. This ballet was presented at the Petit Bourbon on 15 October 1581, and related the story of Circe.

Comic ballets include:

 Cinderella (Ashton)
 Coppélia
 Don Quixote
 La Fille Mal Gardée
 La fille mal gardée (Ashton)
 Frizak the Barber
 The Kermesse in Bruges
 The Lady and the Fool
 The Magic Flute
 The Parisian Market or Le Marché des Innocents
 Pineapple Poll
 Pirates of Penzance - The Ballet!
 Punch and the Judy

References

Ballet terminology